Atwater station is a Montreal Metro station in the borough of Ville-Marie in Montreal, Quebec, Canada. It is operated by the Société de transport de Montréal (STM) and serves the Green Line on the border between the city of Westmount and Montreal.

The station opened on October 14, 1966, as part of the original network of the Metro; it was the western terminus of the Green Line until the extension to Angrignon in 1978.

Architecture and art 
Designed by David, Boulva et Cleve, it is a normal side platform station, built in open cut under the De Maisonneuve Boulevard. It has a large mezzanine with ticket barriers on either end. It has underground city connections to Place Alexis Nihon, Westmount Square, and Dawson College.

In August 2016, the Dawson exit was closed for refurbishment. In January 2017 the Cabot Square entrance was closed for major renovations and also to make the building unwelcoming to drug use and violent gangs the premises

, work is underway to make the station universally accessible. Phase 2 of this project is due to begin in 2023.

The station is equipped with MétroVision information screens which display news, commercials, and the time until the next train.

Origin of the name
This station is named for Atwater Avenue, named for Edwin Atwater (1808–1874), a municipal alderman of the district of Saint-Antoine. The street was named for him in 1871.

Connecting bus routes

Entrances

3015 Boulevard De Maisonneuve

2322 Rue Ste Catherine (via the Alexis Nihon Complex)

Nearby points of interests

Connected via the underground city
Place Alexis Nihon
Westmount Square
Dawson College

Other
Atwater Library
Montreal Forum
 Cabot Square
Westmount City Hall
Temple Emanu-El Beth Sholom
Église Saint-Léon-de-Westmount
 Batshaw Youth & Family Centres

References

External links

Atwater Station — official site
Montreal by Metro, metrodemontreal.com — photos, information, and trivia
 2011 STM System Map
 2011 Downtown System Map
 Metro Map

Green Line (Montreal Metro)
Railway stations in Canada opened in 1966
Downtown Montreal
Westmount, Quebec